KGRG-FM (89.9 FM) is a radio station in Auburn, Washington owned by Green River College. The station broadcasts over the air at 89.9 MHz and as well as online. The station also broadcasts in HD.

KGRG-FM broadcasts GRCC and local high school playoff athletic events live.

The station antenna is located within the dense residential neighborhood of Lakeland Hills in Auburn, Washington near the intersection of Panorama Drive and Hazel Ave, near the King/Pierce County border. The digital power of the HD radio signal was increased by 4 times in April 2011.

KGRG-FM was chosen to be one of the first college radio stations to be available on iHeartRadio's College section and became #1 in their first month on the site.

References

External links
KGRG 89.9 FM
KGRG-FM is at 

GRG-FM
GRG-FM
Auburn, Washington
Green River College